Ladice is a village and municipality in Zlaté Moravce District of the Nitra Region, in western-central Slovakia.

History
In historical records the village was first mentioned in 1075.

Geography
It has a population of about 800 people.

References

External links
 https://web.archive.org/web/20080111223415/http://www.statistics.sk/mosmis/eng/run.html

Villages and municipalities in Zlaté Moravce District